Schoolhouse Rock! is a television soundtrack based on the animated television series Schoolhouse Rock!, released by Rhino Records on June 18, 1996, and contains 52 tracks. In 2018, the album was selected by the Library of Congress for preservation in the United States National Recording Registry for being "culturally, historically, or aesthetically significant".

Track listing

Disc one (Multiplication Rock)

Disc two (Grammar Rock / Money Rock)

Disc three (America Rock)

Disc four (Science Rock / Computer Rock)

Notes 

Television animation soundtracks
1996 soundtrack albums
Schoolhouse Rock!
Rhino Records compilation albums
Soundtrack compilation albums
1996 compilation albums
Rhino Records soundtracks
Children's music albums
United States National Recording Registry recordings
United States National Recording Registry albums